Akkystau, also known as Aqqystau, (Akkystau, اككىستاۋ) is a town in Atyrau Region, southwest Kazakhstan.

References

Atyrau Region
Cities and towns in Kazakhstan